Liberty is an unincorporated community and census-designated place in Sequoyah County, Oklahoma, United States. Its population was 220 as of the 2010 census.

Liberty had a post office from August 24, 1914, until August 15, 1927.

Geography

Education
The school, Liberty School, made local news after the Sandy Hook shooting in 2013 by installing bomb-resistant glass in its windows and doors as a security measure. The school provides education for children in grades K - 8.

References

Unincorporated communities in Sequoyah County, Oklahoma
Unincorporated communities in Oklahoma
Census-designated places in Sequoyah County, Oklahoma
Census-designated places in Oklahoma